She Zhijiang, known as Tang Kriang Kai, and by numerous other aliases including She Lunkai, and Dylan She, is a Chinese businessman and chairman of Yatai International Holdings Group, which has gambling investments throughout Southeast Asia, including Cambodia, the Philippines, and Myanmar. A convicted criminal in China, She was a fugitive until his capture by Thai police in August 2022. She's business operations have been linked with human trafficking, extortion, and cyber scams.

Early life 
She was born in Shaodong, Hunan, China .

Business interests 
She's company, Yatai International Holdings Group (abbreviated Yatai IHG), is registered in Hong Kong and headquartered in Thailand. She became a fugitive in 2012, after fleeing Chinese authorities. In 2014, a Shandong court convicted him of running an illegal lottery business in the Philippines that targeted Chinese online users, and had netted US$298 million in profits.

In 2015, She began building a business in Cambodia, involved in the illicit business of helping Chinese gamblers front-load gambling bets made in Cambodian casinos. From there, he expanded his business interests to the Philippines and acquired ownership of one of Manila's largest spa and entertainment centers. In 2017, he acquired Cambodian citizenship, during which he changed his name to Tang Kriang Kai. Cambodia's government grants citizenship to individuals who donate at least US$250,000 to the government. Between January 2018 and February 2021, She allegedly colluded to register gambling companies and recruited 330,000 gamblers, netting US$22.2 million in proceeds from gambling scams.

Foray into Myanmar 
In 2017, Yatai received a conditional permit from the Myanmar Investment Commission to develop a small-scale housing estate in Shwe Kokko, near the Burmese-Thai border town of Myawaddy. Shwe Kokko is controlled by the Kayin State Border Guard Force (BGF), consisting of former Democratic Karen Buddhist Army forces that were formally integrated into the Myanmar Armed Forces in 2010. In 2019, the Cambodian government banned online gambling, which had come to dominate the local economy in Sihanoukville. In response, Chinese casino and other illicit cyber scam operators quickly exited Cambodia, and found a new base at Yatai's development and similar Chinese-led developments like Saixigang and Huanya International New City Project, along Myanmar's borders. 

In promotional materials, Yatai claimed to be developing a US$15 billion special economic zone called the Yatai New City, encompassing . The scale of Yatai's ongoing development surpassed what had been approved by the Burmese government, prompting additional scrutiny from Burmese authorities. In 2020, Myanmar's civilian-led government formed a tribunal to investigate irregularities in the Yatai development project, successfully halting the project. Tensions between the Kayin State Border Guard Force and the Myanmar Armed Forces escalated over the development. The Chinese government distanced itself from Yatai's development, after an expose on She was published by Caixin.

However, after the 2021 Myanmar coup d'état, during which the Burmese military deposed the civilian-led government, the military became pre-occupied with addressing the ensuing Myanmar civil war, enabling the development in Shwe Kokko, now a regional human trafficking and cyber scamming hub, to resume. Buildings have been converted into prison-like hubs from which cybercriminals run scams that target internet users around the world.

Arrest in Thailand 
On 13 August 2022, Thai police arrested She in Bangkok, with plans to extradite him to China to face criminal charges.

Notes

References 

Chinese businesspeople
Prisoners and detainees of China
People extradited to China
1982 births
People from Hunan
People from Shaodong
Businesspeople from Hunan
People extradited from Thailand
Gambling in China
Living people
21st-century Chinese criminals
Fugitives wanted by China